This article shows the 2015 season of South Korean football.

National team results

Senior team

Under-23 team

K League

K League Classic

K League Challenge

Promotion-relegation playoffs
The promotion-relegation playoffs were held between the winners of the 2015 K League Challenge playoffs and the 11th-placed club of the 2015 K League Classic. The winners on aggregate score after both matches earned entry into the 2016 K League Classic.

Suwon FC won 3–0 on aggregate and were promoted to the K League Classic, while Busan IPark were relegated to the K League Challenge.

Korean FA Cup

Korea National League

WK League

Table

Playoff and championship

AFC Champions League

See also
Football in South Korea

References

External links

 
Seasons in South Korean football